Eleri Earnshaw (born 17 May 1985) is a football player and coach who has played for the Welsh national team, the New York Magic, and Arsenal Ladies. Earnshaw is currently the assistant coach of Angel City FC in the National Women's Soccer League (NWSL). She was previously the acting head coach and assistant coach of Fordham University Women's Soccer. Prior to that she was Head Coach for LIU Sharks Division 1 Women's Soccer Team and acted an Assistant Coach for CCSU and Yale University. She also served as Head Coach of NJ/NY Gotham FC Reserves in 2021, leading them to a WPSL conference championship and earning Coach of the Year. Earnshaw played as a defender and midfielder and has accumulated more than twenty caps for Wales.

Club career
Earnshaw attended Ysgol Glan Clwyd and also played for Bangor City Girls in the FA Women's Premier League Northern Division. In November 2000, a 15-year-old Earnshaw scored twice against Charlton Athletic in an FA Women's Premier League Cup tie. She won a scholarship to Arsenal Ladies' Academy in September 2001.

After spending a period with Barnet in 2002–03, Earnshaw helped Arsenal win a domestic double in 2003–04.

She then moved to America to play varsity soccer while attending Iona College (New York). After three successful seasons with The Gaels, Earnshaw moved to Long Island University for a final season of college soccer in 2007.

International career
Earnshaw won 13 caps and scored three goals for Wales at U–19 level. She made her senior debut, aged 17 and two days, in a 2–0 defeat to Scotland in May 2002.

References

External links
Eleri Earnshaw at UEFA
Eleri Earnshaw at FAW
LIU assistant coaching profile
Central Connecticut coaching profile
Yale coaching profile
LIU head coaching profile
Fordham coaching profile
Angel City FC coaching profile

1985 births
Living people
Sportspeople from St Asaph
Arsenal W.F.C. players
Wales women's international footballers
FA Women's National League players
Iona University alumni
Long Island University alumni
Sportspeople from Rhyl
Barnet F.C. Ladies players
Welsh women's footballers
Iona Gaels women's soccer players
LIU Brooklyn Blackbirds women's soccer players
Women's association football managers
Female association football managers
Welsh football managers
Angel City FC non-playing staff
Women's association football midfielders